Arthroleptis pyrrhoscelis is a species of frog in the family Arthroleptidae. It is endemic to the Itombwe and Kabobo highlands in the eastern Democratic Republic of the Congo. Its natural habitat is montane grassland. It is supposedly a common species.

References

pyrrhoscelis
Endemic fauna of the Democratic Republic of the Congo
Amphibians of the Democratic Republic of the Congo
Taxa named by Raymond Laurent
Amphibians described in 1952
Taxonomy articles created by Polbot